Tinashe Mushakavanhu was born in Harare, Zimbabwe. He is a writer, editor and scholar based at St Anne's College, University of Oxford. Previously, he was a postdoctoral fellow at the Wits Institute for Social & Economic Research (WiSER) at University of the Witwatersrand in Johannesburg, South Africa. He holds a PhD in English from University of Kent.

Background 
Mushakavanhu was born and grew up in Harare, and when he was sixteen his family moved to the city of Gweru where he attended Fletcher High School, a once historically prominent school in Zimbabwe.

Education 
He joined Midlands State University in 2002, two years after it was established, and later graduated with a first class honours degree in English & Communication. Afterwards, he moved to Trinity College, Carmarthen where he graduated with an MA in Creative Writing. Subsequently, he went on to receive a PhD in English from the University of Kent. He has held prestigious fellowships in Edinburgh, Johannesburg and New York and gave talks and lectures at various universities and colleges.

Writing 
As a university student, Mushakavanhu was an active member of the now defunct Budding Writers Association of Zimbabwe (BWAZ), where he was elected as the National Secretary of its executive committee. He has participated a number of writing programmes including the British Council's Crossing Borders Creative Writing project between 2004 and 2005, a mentoring initiative that paired young African writers with experienced British writers. He was also a writer in residence at Rhodes University.

Media 
Inspired by his late uncle, Lovemore Dexter Mushaka, the young Mushakavanhu was always drawn to journalism from a young age. He was a columnist for The Standard before he was hired to be inaugural Online Editor at The Financial Gazette, Zimbabwe's oldest private newspaper. He then moved to New York where he joined the CUNY Graduate School of Journalism as a Tow-Knight Entrepreneurial Journalism Fellow. Mushakavanhu was the first winner of the KNIGHT-VICE  Innovator's Fund which had been initiated by Vice Media co-founder Shane Smith. He was a CNN Diversity Fellow at the 2016 Online News Association (ONA) in Denver, Colorado. Together with Nontsikelelo Mutiti they co-founded Black Chalk & Co a boutique media and research studio, and their work included synchronised events, publications and exhibitions.

Awards 
Miles Morland Writing Scholar, 2021

Open Society Soros Arts Fellowship, 2019

Publications 
Reincarnating Marechera: Notes on a Speculative Archive (Ugly Duckling Presse, 2020)
Some Writers Can Give You Two Heart Beats with Nontsikelelo Mutiti (Black Chalk & Co, 2019)
Visa Stories: Experiences Between Law & Migration with F. Menozzi, B. Kemal (Cambridge Scholars Publishing, 2013)
State of the Nation: Contemporary Zimbabwean Poetry with David Nettleingham (The Conversation Paperpress, 2009)

References 

Alumni of the University of Kent
Alumni of the University of Wales
Fellows of St Anne's College, Oxford
Year of birth missing (living people)
Living people